Lucidu Town is an urban town in Taojiang County, Hunan Province, People's Republic of China.

Administrative division
The town is divided into 15 villages and 1 community, the following areas: Shahe Community, Huaqiao Village, Dajiang Village, Banxi Village, Yuxi Village, Meishan Village, Qiaogongba Village, Xuetangwan Village, Qingtang Village, Changjiang Village, Lucidu Village, Baimu Village, Datang Village, Longtangwan Village, Shilongtang Village, and Fengjingsi Village (沙河社区、花桥村、大江村、板溪村、玉溪村、梅山村、千功坝村、学堂湾村、清塘村、长江村、鸬鹚渡村、百亩村、大塘村、龙塘湾村、石龙塘村、风景寺村).

References

External links

Divisions of Taojiang County